Logan University, formerly Logan College of Chiropractic until 2013, is a private special focus university providing college education in chiropractic and the health sciences in Chesterfield, Missouri.

History

The college was named after its founder and first president, Hugh B. Logan, D.C. The first class of seven men and women enrolled on September 1, 1935. The college was housed in a converted residence at 4490 Lindell Boulevard, St. Louis' Central West End area. After five more students joined in February 1936, the college  moved to a  estate at 7701 Florissant Road in Normandy. a suburb of St. Louis that November.

In 1958, Carver College of Chiropractic (founded in 1906) of Oklahoma City merged with Logan Basic College of Chiropractic. In 1964, Missouri Chiropractic College also merged with Logan Basic College of Chiropractic with the name then changing to Logan College of Chiropractic.

In 1972, Logan acquired the buildings and grounds of the former Maryknoll Seminary in Chesterfield, Missouri. Additional buildings have since been constructed; the Health Center in 1982,  the Science and Research Center in 1986, the Sports/Wellness Complex with adjacent ballfields and pavilion in 2000, the William D. Purser Center in 2007, and the Standard Process Student Center in 2008. Additionally, the former Maryknoll chapel was renovated and transformed into the Learning Resource Center in 2003, the Biofreeze Sports & Rehabilitation Center was added to the Health Center in 2006,. and the university opened a new Educational Wing which includes an assessment center in 2012. The campus is on a  wooded hilltop and was included in MSNBC's 2007 list of “America’s Most Beautiful College Campuses”.

The institution changed its name to Logan University in 2013–14.

Leadership
Since March 2013, the Logan University president has been J. Clay McDonald, DC, MBA, JD.

Previous presidents
 Hugh B. Logan, 1936–1944
 Vinton F. Logan, 1944–1961
 William Coggins, 1961–1979
 Milton T. Morter, Jr., 1979–1980
 Beatrice B. Hagen, 1980–1992
 George A. Goodman, 1992–2013
 J. Clay McDonald, 2013–Present

Academics
The university is classified as a Special focus institution by the Carnegie Classification of Institutions of Higher Education.

Logan offers two baccalaureate degrees, three master's degrees, and doctoral degrees in Chiropractic and Health Professions Education. The master's programs and the Doctorate of Health Professions Education are offered completely online.

Logan University confers degrees from its two schools:

Logan College of Chiropractic
 Doctor of Chiropractic
Logan College of Health Sciences
 Doctor of Health Professions Education
 Master's of Science - Health Informatics
 Master's of Science - Nutrition and Human Performance
 Master's of Science - Sports Science and Rehabilitation
 Bachelor's Degree - Life Science
 Bachelor's Degree - Human Biology

Accreditation
The chiropractic program is accredited by the Council on Chiropractic Education (C.C.E.) and has had full accreditation since 1978.  The Higher Learning Commission of the North Central Association of College and Schools has granted Logan accreditation of its baccalaureate, master's and doctoral degree programs since 1987.

3+3 articulation agreements
Logan has agreements with 52 colleges and universities from 22 states that allow students from those schools to enter Logan's Doctor of Chiropractic Program after completion of three years study and to be awarded their baccalaureate degrees from the partner schools after successful completion of their first year at Logan.
The chiropractic program is accredited by the Council on Chiropractic Education (C.C.E.) and has had full accreditation since 1978.  The Higher Learning Commission of the North Central Association of College and Schools has granted Logan accreditation of its baccalaureate, master's and doctoral degree programs since 1987.

Athletic internships
Logan has established partnerships with the athletic departments at Harris–Stowe State University, Lindenwood University, University of Missouri, and Southern Illinois University Edwardsville. Logan maintains a clinic and assigns interns to provide chiropractic care to the athletes at each of the four schools.

Doctor of Chiropractic program
The Logan Doctor of Chiropractic program includes study in the Basic, Chiropractic and Clinical Sciences.  Pre-requisites for entering the Doctor of Chiropractic (D.C.) program include at least 90 semester hours of undergraduate coursework, including courses in  biological sciences,  general and organic chemistry, physics,  English,  psychology; and   humanities/social sciences.

After pre-clinical courses, all students study Logan Basic Technique and its biomechanical foundation, the Logan System of Body Mechanics, and Diversified Technique. Students can also choose from eleven elective techniques: Activator Methods, Active Release Technique (ART), Applied Kinesiology, Flexion-Distraction (COX), Gonstead System, Graston Technique, Pro-Adjustor, Sacro-Occipital Technique (SOT), Soft Tissue, Thompson, Upper Cervical Specific.

Students train under the direct supervision of teaching clinicians.  Training includes professional application and synthesis of scientific aptitude, clinical competence and ethical demeanor through eight outpatient clinics (five of which are fee for service and three are free) in the St. Louis metropolitan area.

Research
Logan's Office of Scholarship and Sponsored Programs (OSSP) now coordinates both internal institutional research and external research grants and contracts that were formerly handled by a separate division of research. The OSSP is also responsible for supporting student scholarship and research.

Student life

Student body
The student body at Logan consists of only 8% undergraduates, with doctoral students making up nearly 51% of enrollment. 56.5% of the students are male and 43.5% female. The overwhelming majority of the students are from around the United States, while there are only about a dozen international students.

Student clubs and activities
Logan hosts about 30 student organizations, Greek organizations, and sports clubs. Students are encouraged to take advantage of the campus recreational facilities, including the disc golf course; 1/4 mile running track; basketball, tennis, and sand volleyball courts; and the weights and workout equipment inside the Sports/Wellness Center.

The Greek community has four organizations, of which only one (Pi Kappa Chi) has chapters elsewhere.

Athletics and sports
While Logan previously fielded intercollegiate athletic teams, it has not done so since 2010–11. In 2015, there are club teams in men's basketball, soccer, softball, and ice hockey, as well as women's basketball and co-ed soccer and softball.

Student government
The nine-member Logan Student Government represents the student body on student concerns, governs the actions of recognized student organizations, adopts the Student Code of Conduct, sponsors student events, and governs the financing of student organizations.

References

External links
 

Private universities and colleges in Missouri
Chiropractic schools in the United States
Educational institutions established in 1935
Universities and colleges in St. Louis County, Missouri
1935 establishments in Missouri